Judge Perez Drive is a major, four-lane thoroughfare located in St. Bernard Parish, Louisiana. The road was originally named Goodchildren Drive, but was renamed in November 1969 for former political boss of St. Bernard and Plaquemines Parishes, Judge Leander Perez (died March 1969). However, in the late 1990s, St. Bernard officials chose to distance themselves from Leander Perez's segregationist legacy. They dedicated Judge Perez Drive to the memory of Melvyn Perez, a long-time judge in St. Bernard—thus distancing the Parish from Leander Perez's controversial legacy without the expense of changing the signs labeled "Judge Perez Drive". However, the term "Judge Perez" is still most frequently associated with Leander Perez in the area.

This is the main commercial artery of St. Bernard Parish. Almost all of the retail and commercial development for St. Bernard is located along Judge Perez Drive. Retail development is especially dense along West Judge Perez Drive in Chalmette, where nearly all of the frontage is commercial. Nearly every major fast food chain is represented here, as well as several large national retailers, many with multiple locations. Along with St. Bernard Highway, and Paris Road, Judge Perez Drive is one of the three major arteries that are the only means of access in and out of St. Bernard Parish. All three arteries connect with major thoroughfares in neighboring Orleans Parish.

The thoroughfare, which carries the designation of Louisiana Highway 39, begins as West Judge Perez Drive in Arabi at the border between Orleans and St. Bernard parishes as a continuation of North Claiborne Avenue. It becomes East Judge Perez Drive at its intersection with Paris Road (Louisiana Highway 47) and continues as such for several miles. It narrows to two lanes and ends at Bayou Road, near St. Bernard High School. 

The flooding waterlogged and undermined the road foundation. In the aftermath of the storm, the large military vehicles and heavy supply trucks traveling to the area for relief caused the roadway to cave in or be crushed in some areas, as with most major roads in areas that remained under water for more than two weeks. Temporary repairs were made, but the road remains very rough in parts.

See also
St. Bernard Parish
Chalmette High School

References

External links
New Orleans Roads Scholars, November 2010 

Roads in Louisiana
Transportation in St. Bernard Parish, Louisiana